Myodocha is a genus of long-necked seed bugs in the family Rhyparochromidae. There are about 10 described species in Myodocha.

Species
These 10 species belong to the genus Myodocha:
 Myodocha annulicornis Blatchley, 1926 (banded long-necked seed bug)
 Myodocha froeschneri Slater, 1998
 Myodocha fulvosa Barber, 1954
 Myodocha giraffa Stal, 1862
 Myodocha intermedia Distant, 1893
 Myodocha longicollis Stal, 1874
 Myodocha parcicoma Cervantes, 2005
 Myodocha serripes Olivier, 1811 (long-necked seed bug)
 Myodocha unispinopilosa Cervantes, 2005
 Myodocha unispinosa Stal, 1874

References

External links

 

Rhyparochromidae
Articles created by Qbugbot